PICC may refer to:

 People's Insurance Company of China, a Chinese insurance company
Peripherally inserted central catheter (PICC), in medicine, a type of intravenous line also known as a PICC line.
 Philippine International Convention Center
 PIC C The C programming language for Microchip's PIC microcontroller 
 Presubscribed Interexchange Carrier Charge, an interconnection payment paid between telephone companies in North America
 Principles of International Commercial Contracts, a document attempting to harmonize the international contract law.
 Proximity Integrated Circuit Card; see Proximity card
 Putrajaya International Convention Centre, a convention center in Putrajaya, Malaysia